An FCurve (also written f-curve) is a function curve or the graph of a function. An example of a FCurve is a spline.

In the field of computer animation and especially in animation editors, e.g. Maya, an FCurve is an animation curve with a set of keyframes, which are represented as points, curve segments between keys, and tangents that control how curve segments enter and exit a key. These keys are laid out on a graph that displays their position relative to zero. One can have keys that are either positive or negative values.

This visual graph of keyframes allows one to see the value of the key and its interpolation to the next key, which shows the animation "ease ins" and "ease outs".

Computer animation